Jones Falls may refer to:
 Jones Falls, a river in Maryland, United States
 Jones Falls, Ontario, a hamlet in Rideau Lakes, Ontario, Canada
 Jones Falls Dam, a dam on the Rideau Canal in Rideau Lakes, Ontario
 Jones Falls Expressway, an expressway in Maryland carrying Interstate 83
 Jones Falls (Queensland), a waterfall in Queensland, Australia